Midtown West is a 12-acre commercial development in West Midtown, Atlanta. It consists of historic warehouse space renovated for use as restaurants, other hospitality and offices. It includes the Brickworks building at the intersection of Howell Mill Rd. and Marietta St.

Tenants include the 5 Seasons Westside Brewpub, Emily Amy Gallery, and three restaurants: Miller Union, Bocado and The Optimist.

External links
Official website

References

Buildings and structures in Atlanta
Mixed-use developments in Georgia (U.S. state)
Restaurant districts and streets in the United States